Floorball Canada is the highest governing body for the sport of floorball in Canada. Floorball Canada is a self-governed organization which is recognized by the International Floorball Federation (IFF), Government of Canada, Sport Canada, and the Canadian Olympic Committee.

Floorball Canada organizes the Canada Cup every year, which hosts teams from all across the country to compete in elite, intermediate, recreation and children divisions. Floorball Canada organizes the elite-level national league (Floorball League of Canada as well as men's, women's, men's under-19, and women's under-19 national floorball teams. Floorball Canada has hosted the 2016 Women's under-19 World Championships, in Belleville, Ontario, and the 2019 Men's under-19 World Floorball Championships, in Halifax, Nova Scotia.

Floorball Canada has been recognized by Hockey Canada as an excellent sport for off ice training for hockey players.

Organization
Floorball Canada is divided into four regional federations: Alberta Floorball Association, British Columbia Floorball Federation, Floorball Ontario, and Québec Floorball Association. Floorball Canada's goal is to add three more regional branches: Saskatchewan, Manitoba, and an Atlantic federation, which would include the three maritime provinces and Newfoundland & Labrador.

Floorball Canada has been an ordinary member of the International Floorball Federation since 2001. Canada was given membership as part of the IFF in 1998, and have been competing in World Championships since that time.

Floorball is looking to grow as an organization over the next several years. Hoping to grow the game into a common game known by everyone around the country.

See also
Canada men's national floorball team
Canada men's under-19 national floorball team
Canadian Floorball League

References

External links
Official Floorball Canada page

Canada
Floorball
Floorball in Canada
Floorball governing bodies
1998 establishments in Canada